During the 2005–06 English football season, Watford competed in the Football League Championship.

Season summary
Against the odds, Watford managed to gain promotion to the Premier League through the play-offs, defeating Leeds United 3–0 in the play-off final to return to the top flight after an absence of six years. Crucial to Watford's promotion was striker Marlon King, who was the Championship's top scorer. Striker Darius Henderson and young winger Ashley Young also chipped in with 15 and 14 league goals respectively; between them, the three scored 51 of the club's 77 goals scored in the league.

Final league table

Results
Watford's score comes first

Legend

Football League Championship

Championship play-offs

FA Cup

League Cup

Players

First-team squad
Squad at end of season

Left club during season

Statistics

Appearances, goals and cards
(Starting appearances + substitute appearances)

References

Notes

Watford F.C. seasons
Watford